Laurelhurst may refer to:

 Laurelhurst, Portland, Oregon, a neighborhood in Portland, Oregon
 Laurelhurst Park, a city park in Portland, Oregon
 Laurelhurst Theater, a theater in Portland, Oregon
 Laurelhurst, Seattle, a neighborhood in Seattle, Washington